Mobile World is a monthly publication that is published from Karachi and is distributed across Pakistan and internationally. It is particularly aimed at the car, motorcycle, truck, bus, tractor and allied sectors but also covers a range of international topics around Road transport, Tyre, International Events, Fair, Exhibition, New Products, Auto parts, Government policy and Scandal, Special Report Interviews and Road Safety.

History
With the re-emergence of transport industry in Pakistan during the late 1990s it had become important to bring about a publication which would incorporate the ongoing developments and arising issues in the industry. In this situation, the magazine received wider recognition right from its launch in August 1999.

Objectives 
 The magazine aims to provide up to date information on current international events related to the automobile, motorcycle, tyre, International Events, Fair & Exhibition and other automotive related industries.
 It also follows news and views from its readership. The readership includes buyers, sellers, dealers and manufacturers as well as common users of public and private transport.
 It reports on the innovative developments in the technology and translates them into their potential impact on the decision makers, investors and opinion leaders.

Media Partner for the Events, Fair & Exhibitions
It has honored to cover GAF-2014 the 5th Annual Global Automotive Forum hosted by CCPIT, China Council for the Promotion of International Trade, Automotive Committee in Wuhan held on October 16–17 as the official media partner from Pakistan and the November-2014 edition was exclusively presented the post event report in the interest of valued readers to enlighten them about present and the future status of automotive industry in China.

Qingdao warmly welcomed to attend 11th China International Tyre and Rubber Technology Exhibition jointly organized by People’s Government of Shandong Province and Shandong Rubber Trade Association in Qingdao International Convention Center from 9–11 April 2014. It has been a great event in Asia Pacific area with the rapid growth of Rubber tyre industry in China and more than ten years’ development and innovation. The scale of event keeps expanding and will hit a new record to create great gathering for the chains of rubber tire industry from downstream to upstream. The Coverage and Post Event Report published in May-2014 edition.

As a whole the CIMAMotor 2011 was a great experience for Mobile World The 10th China International Motorcycle Exhibition (CIMAMotor 2011) was held on 13 to 16 October 2011 in Chongqing International Convention and Exhibition Center. As China’s largest motorcycle trade show, CIMAMotor was founded in 2002, an annual, after nine years of training and development, it has become the world’s major professional exhibition of motorcycles.

Loncin factory visit 
Mobile World team during its visit of Loncin Motor Co., Ltd learnt that this is one of the largest private enterprises in Chongqing. In 2009, with turnover of more than 10.6 billions RMB, it was ranked as No.7 of Chongqing Top 50 Industry enterprises.

Road safety 
With the growing number of motorists and increased influx of road transport, road safety is one such feature that has been promoted and recognised through the consumer organisations. The magazine in this respect has played valuable role in bringing up the transport safety issues to the public debate.

External links
 Official website

1999 establishments in Pakistan
Magazines established in 1999
Mass media in Karachi
Magazines published in Pakistan
Monthly magazines published in Pakistan
Automobile magazines
English-language magazines published in Pakistan
Transport magazines